Lucas Díaz Parcero (born 10 May 1996) is a Spanish professional footballer who plays as a goalkeeper for CD Atlético Baleares.

Club career
Born in Geneva to Spanish parents, Díaz moved to Spain at early age and joined SD Compostela's youth setup. On 11 May 2014, aged only 18, he made his first team debut after coming on as a second-half substitute in a 0–2 Segunda División B away loss against UD Logroñés.

In 2015, after finishing his formation, Díaz was assigned to the farm team CFA Estudiantil in the regional leagues. The following year, he was definitely promoted to the main squad, now in the Tercera División, and became a regular starter.

On 10 July 2018, Díaz moved to Real Oviedo and was assigned to the reserves in the third division. On 19 July of the following year, he signed for another reserve team, Racing de Santander B in division four.

On 24 August 2019, as both Iván Crespo and Luca Zidane were injured, Díaz made his professional debut for Racing de Santander by starting in a 1–1 away draw against UD Almería in the Segunda División.

References

External links
 
 
 

1996 births
Living people
Footballers from Geneva
Swiss men's footballers
Swiss people of Spanish descent
Spanish footballers
Association football goalkeepers
Segunda División players
Primera Federación players
Segunda División B players
Tercera División players
Divisiones Regionales de Fútbol players
SD Compostela footballers
Real Oviedo Vetusta players
Rayo Cantabria players
Racing de Santander players
CD Atlético Baleares footballers